Barrabas or Barrabás are the Spanish and Portuguese name for Barabbas, the prisoner who, according to the New Testament, was chosen by the crowd in Jerusalem, over Jesus of Nazareth, to be pardoned and released by Roman governor Pontius Pilate at the Passover feast.

It may also refer to:

Barrabás, a Spanish music group
Barrabás (album), 1977 album by the band
Barrabas (film), 1920 French silent crime thriller
Barrabás (magazine), Spanish satirical magazine
Barrabas (wrestler), Puerto Rican WWC wrestler
 Barrabas, racehorse that won the Prix Ganay in 1930
Barrabas, 1986 comic title by Slave Labor Graphics
Gabriel Jaime Gómez Jaramillo (born 1959), known as Barrabás, Colombian football player

See also

Barabas (disambiguation)
Barabbas (disambiguation)
Barnabas (disambiguation)